Richard Katz (born August 16, 1950) is an American former politician. A member of the Democratic Party, Katz served in the California State Assembly for the 39th district from 1980 until 1996. Katz was Minority Leader of the Assembly between 1995 and 1996 being the most recent Democrat to hold the office, as Democrats have held a majority since 1996.

1998 Election
Katz attempted a legislative comeback in 1998, narrowly losing the primary for the 20th Senate district to LA City Councilman Richard Alarcon.

Post Assembly Career
Katz was a major proponent of the San Fernando Valley secession movement—cochairing the failed Measure F, an initiative effort that appeared on the 2002 ballot.

An ally of Los Angeles Mayor Antonio Villaraigosa, he was Villaraigosa's public appointee to the Los Angeles County Metropolitan Transportation Authority board and Metrolink board chair. Although he supported City Controller Wendy Greuel's candidacy for mayor in 2013, Katz was appointed to the city planning commission by the successful candidate, Mayor Eric Garcetti.

Personal life

Katz is married to Wendy Mitchell, who has served in various capacities in the California State Legislature, and was appointed to the California Coastal Commission in 2010.

References

Democratic Party members of the California State Assembly
Living people
Jewish American state legislators in California
Politicians from Los Angeles
1950 births
21st-century American Jews